Michał Eryk Łasko (born 11 March 1981) is an Italian former volleyball player of Polish descent, member of the Italy men's national volleyball team, bronze medallist at the Olympic Games (London 2012), 2005 European Champion, 2001 Italian Champion.

Personal life
Michał Łasko was born in Wrocław, Poland, but raised in Italy. His father, Lech Łasko, is a former Polish volleyball player - 1976 Olympic Champion. He plays for the Italian national team, because he was raised in Italy and he has never received an offer to play for Poland. He speaks the Polish language very well. On 17 June 2013 he married Milena Stacchiotti, an Italian volleyball player. On 8 October 2014 his wife gave birth to their first child, a daughter named Nicole. On 30 August 2016 their second daughter Asia was born.

Career

Clubs
Michał lived in Italy since his childhood and started playing for Sisley Treviso's youth team. He debuted in Serie A1 in 2001 with Treviso, after moving to Verona, where he remained for four years, playing in A1 and A2. After a year at Vibo Valentia, he was signed by BreBanca Lannutti Cuneo in 2006. In 2008, together with Simone Parodi, he moved to Blu Volley Verona. Łasko is currently playing for Jastrzębski Węgiel in the Polish volleyball league, PlusLiga. On 19 June 2015 he announced that he had moved to Chinese team Sichuan Chengdu, together with Zbigniew Bartman - one of his teammates from previous club.

National team
With Italy, he won a title of the European Champion 2005, a silver medal at the European Championship 2011 and a bronze medal at the Olympic Games 2012.

Sporting achievements

Clubs
 CEV European Champions Cup
  1999/2000 – with Sisley Treviso
 FIVB Club World Championship
  Doha 2011 – with Jastrzębski Węgiel
 National championships
 1999/2000  Italian Cup, with Sisley Treviso
 1999/2000  Italian SuperCup, with Sisley Treviso
 2000/2001  Italian Championship, with Sisley Treviso

Individual awards
 2012: Polish Cup – Best Spiker
 2014: CEV Champions League – Best Scorer

References

External links

 
 
 
 Player profile at LegaVolley.it 
 Player profile at PlusLiga.pl 
 Player profile at Volleybox.net

1981 births
Living people
Italian people of Polish descent
Polish emigrants to Italy
Naturalised citizens of Italy
Sportspeople from Wrocław
Italian men's volleyball players
Italian Champions of men's volleyball
Olympic volleyball players of Italy
Olympic medalists in volleyball
Olympic bronze medalists for Italy
Volleyball players at the 2012 Summer Olympics
Medalists at the 2012 Summer Olympics
Italian expatriate sportspeople in China
Expatriate volleyball players in China
Italian expatriate sportspeople in Russia
Expatriate volleyball players in Russia
Blu Volley Verona players
Jastrzębski Węgiel players
Ural Ufa volleyball players
Opposite hitters